

L
L.A. Express
"Dance the Night Away" (1976)
La Bionda
"Sandstorm" (1978), "One For You, One For Me" (1978), "Never Gonna Let You Go" (1979)
Labelle
"Lady Marmalade" (1974), "What Can I Do for You" (1974), "Messin' with My Mind" (1975), "Get You Somebody New" (1976)
Patti LaBelle
"Eyes in the Back of My Head" (1978), "Music Is My Way of Life" (1979), "Ain't That Enough" (1980), "Release" (1980), "Give It Up (The Dawning Of Rejection)" (1980), "Stir It Up" (1984), "New Attitude" (1984)
Cheryl Ladd
"Skinny-dippin'" (1978), "Missing You" (1979), "Dance Forever" (1979)
Cherry Laine
"Catch The Cat" (1978), "Night In Chicago" (1978), "Sea Farewalk" (1978)
Lakeside
"Fantastic Voyage" (1981)
Major Lance
"Love Pains" (1978)
Nicolette Larson
"Lotta Love" (1978)
D.C. LaRue
"Cathedrals" (1976), "Face of Love" (1977), "Let Them Dance" (1978), "Do You Want The Real Thing" (1978), "Hot Jungle Drums and Voodoo Rhythm" (1979)
Stacy Lattisaw
"When You're Young and in Love" (1979), "Jump To The Beat" (1980)
Bettye LaVette
"Doin' the Best That I Can" (1979)
LBS
"Get Out... Who's Next" (1981)
Amanda Lear
"Blood and Honey" (1976), "Queen Of China-Town" (1977), "Enigma (Give A Bit Of Mmh To Me)" (1978), "Follow Me" (1978), "Fashion Pack (Studio 54)" (1979), "Lilli Marlene" (1979), "Diamonds" (1980), "Fever" (1982)
Laura Lee
"Sat-Is-Fac-Tion" (1979)
Ranee Lee
"Disco Man" (1979)
Rita Lee
"Lança Perfume" (1980)
Ramsey Lewis
"Aquarius/Let the Sun Shine In" (1979), "Dancin'" (1979)
Webster Lewis
"Do It with Style" (1977), "You Deserve to Dance" (1979)
Lime
"Your Love" (1981), "You're My Magician" (1981), "Babe We're Gonna Love Tonight" (1982), "Come And Get Your Love" (1982), "Angel Eyes" (1982), "Agent 406" (1982), "I Don't Wanna Lose You" (1984), "Guilty" (1984), "Take It Up" (1984), "Unexpected Lovers" (1985)
Lipps Inc.
"Funkytown" (1979), "Rock It" (1979), "All Night Dancin'" (1979), "How Long" (1980), "Addicted To The Night" (1983)
Liquid Gold
"My Baby's Baby" (1978), "Dance Yourself Dizzy" (1979), "Substitute" (1980), "The Night, The Wine & The Roses" (1980), "Don't Panic" (1981)
Carol Lloyd 
"Score" (1979)
Logg
"I Know You Will" (1981)
Trini Lopez
"Helplessly" (1978)
Mary Love
"Dance to My Music" (1979)
Love And Kisses
"I Found Love (Now That I Found You)" (1977), "Accidental Lover" (1977), "Thank God It's Friday" (1978), "How Much, How Much I Love You" (1979)
Love De-Luxe
"Here Comes That Sound Again" (1978)
Sylvia Love
"Instant Love" (1979)
Love Unlimited Orchestra
"Love's Theme" (1973), "Satin Soul" (1974), "My Sweet Summer Suite" (1976), Brazilian Love Song (1976), "Theme from King Kong" (1977), "Bring It on Up" (1975), "Don't You Know How Much I Love You" (1978), "High-Steppin' Hip-Dressin' Fella" (1979), "Welcome Aboard" (1981)
L.T.D.
"(Every Time I Turn Around) Back in Love Again" (1977), "Kickin' Back" (1981)
Carrie Lucas
"I Gotta Keep Dancing" (1977), "Street-Corner Symphony" (1978), "Dance with You" (1979), "Are You Dancing" (1979)
Cheryl Lynn
"Got To Be Real" (1978), "Star Love" (1979), "Keep It Hot" (1979), "Shake It Up Tonight" (1980), "Encore" (1981)

M
Ralph MacDonald
"Where Is the Love" (1977), "The Path" (1978), "Discolypso" (1979)
Mandrill
"Stay Tonite" (1978)
Barry Manilow
"It's a Miracle" (1975), "Copacabana (At The Copa)" (1978)
Herbie Mann
"Highjack" (1975), "Waterbed" (1976), "The Piper" (1977), "Jisco Dazz" (1978), "Body Oil" (1979), "Superman" (1979)
Kelly Marie
"Make Love To Me" (1978), "Run to Me" (1979), "Feels Like I'm In Love" (1980), "Loving Just for Fun" (1980), "Don't Stop Your Love" (1981), "Head For The Stars" (1981), "Hot Love" (1981), "Love Trial" (1981), "New York At Night" (1981), "Do You Like It Like That" (1981), "I'm On Fire (1983), "Breakout" (1984)
Teena Marie
"I'm a Sucker for Your Love" (duet with Rick James) (1979), "Behind the Groove" (1980), "I Need Your Lovin'" (1980), "Square Biz" (1981), "It Must be Magic" (1981)
Chuck Mangione
"Feels So Good" (1977)
Gap Mangione
"Dancin' Is Makin' Love" (1979), "You're the One" (1979)
Marti
"Hey Love" (1978)
Al Martino
"Volare" (1975)
Barbara Mason
"Love Song" (duet with Bunny Sigler) (1979)
Harvey Mason
"Groovin' You" (1979)
Johnny Mathis
"Night and Day" (1978), "Begin the Beguine" (1979)
Paul Mauriat and his Orchestra
"Love Is Still Blue" (1976), "The Joy of You" (1978), "Overseas Call" (1978)
Curtis Mayfield
"No Goodbyes" (1978), "Tell Me, Tell Me (How Ya Like to Be Loved)" (1979), "Tripin' Out" (1980)
Janice McClain
"Smack Dab in the Middle" (1979)
Van McCoy
"The Hustle" (1975), "Rhythms of the World" (1976), "Disco Movies" (1978), "Lonely Dancer" (1979), "The Hustle II" (1979)
George McCrae
"Rock Your Baby" (1974), "Honey I (I'll Live My Life For You)" (1975), "Givin' Back the Feeling" (1977), "Love in Motion" (1977), "Let's Dance (People All over the World)" (1978), "(You've Got) My Love, My Life, My Soul" (1978)
Gwen McCrae
"Rockin' Chair" (1975), "I Found a Love" (1979), "Melody of Life" (1979), "Keep The Fire Burning" (1982)
McFadden and Whitehead
"Ain't No Stoppin' Us Now" (1979), "Do You Want to Dance" (1979)
Maureen McGovern
"Different Worlds (Theme from Angie)" (1979), "Can't Take My Eyes off You" (1979), "I'm Happy Just to Dance with You" (1979)
Jimmy McGriff
"Sky Hawk" (1978), "Tailgunner" (1978)
Sérgio Mendes
"I'll Tell You" (1978)
The Meters
"Disco Is the Thing Today" (1976)
MFSB
"T.S.O.P. (The Sound of Philadelphia)" (1974), "Sexy" (1975), "T.L.C. (Tender Lovin' Care)" (1975), "K-Jee" (1975)
Miami Sound Machine
"I Want You to Love Me" (1978), "You've Broken My Heart" (1979)
Michael Zager Band
"This Is the Life" (1975), "Let's All Chant" (1978), "Music Fever" (1978),  "You Don't Know a Good Thing" (1978), "Life's a Party" (1979)
Michele (Chantal Curtis) 
"Magic Love" (1977), "Disco Dance" (1977), "Can't You Feel It" (1977)
Tony Middleton
"Lady Fingers" (1976)
Bette Midler
"Hang On In There Baby" (1979), "My Knight In Black Leather" (1979), "Married Men" (1979), "Big Noise From Winnetka" (1979), "Hurricane" (1979)
Midnight Star
"Operator" (1984)
Mighty Clouds of Joy
"Mighty High" (1976)
Roger Miller
"Disco Man" (1979)
Stephanie Mills
"What Cha Gonna Do With My Lovin'?" (1979), "Put Your Body In It" (1979), "You Can Get Over" (1979), "Never Knew Love Like This Before" (1980), "Sweet Sensation" (1980), "Two Hearts" (with Teddy Pendergrass) (1981)
Garnett Mimms
"What It Is" (1977)
Liza Minnelli
"Losing My Mind" (1989) with Pet Shop Boys
The Miracles
"Love Machine" (1975)
Meco Monardo (billed as "Meco")
"Star Wars Theme/Cantina Band" (1977), "Themes from The Wizard of Oz: Over the Rainbow/We're Off to See the Wizard" (1978), "Star Trek Medley" (1979), "Love Theme from Superman" (1979)
The Monotones
"Mono" (1979), "Zero To Zero" (1980)
Jackie Moore
"This Time Baby" (1979), "How's Your Love-Life Baby" (1979)
Melba Moore
"This Is It" (1976), "Good Love Makes Everything Alright" (1977), "You Stepped into My Life" (1978), "Pick Me Up, I'll Dance" (1978), "Night People" (1979), "I Don't Want To Lose Your Love" (1979), "If You Believe In Love" (1979) 
Mother's Finest
"Dis Go Dis Way, Dis Go Dat Way" (1977)
Moulin Rouge
"To Love Somebody" (1979)
Idris Muhammad
"Could Heaven Ever Be Like This" (1977), "Dancing in the Land of Lovely Ladies" (1978), "Disco Man" (1979)
The Muppets
"Movin' Right Along" (1979)
Walter Murphy
"A Fifth of Beethoven" (1976), "Rhapsody in Blue" (1977), "Gentle Explosion" (1978), "Mostly Mozart" (1979), "Classical Dancing" (1979)
Musique
"In the Bush" (1978), "Keep On Jumpin'" (1978), "Summer Love" (1978), "Number One" (1979)

N
Jeanne Napoli
"Oh, No, Don't Let Go" (1976)
Johnny Nash
"Closer" (1979)
David Naughton
"Makin' It" (1979)
New Birth
"Deeper" (1977)
Olivia Newton-John
"Xanadu" (1980)
Paul Nicholas
"Reggae Like It used To Be" (1976), "Dancing With The Captain" (1976), "Grandma's Party" (1976), "Heaven On The 7th Floor" (1977), "Black Daddy" (1977)
Billy Nichols
"Give Your Body up to the Music" (1979)
Nick Straker Band
"A Little Bit Of Jazz" (1980), "A Walk In The Park" (1980), "Leaving On The Midnight Train" (1980)
Maxine Nightingale
"Right Back Where We Started From" (1975), "Gotta Be The One" (1976), "Hideaway" (1979)
The Nolans
"I'm In The Mood For Dancing" (1979), "Don't Make Waves" (1980), "Gotta Pull Myself Together" (1980), "Attention To Me" (1980), "Who's Gonna Rock You" (1981), "Chemistry" (1981), "Don't Love Me Too Hard" (1982), "Crashing Down" (1983)
Patrick Norman (Canadian musician)
"Loving You" (1977), Let's Try Once Again" (1977)

O
Billy Ocean
"Love Really Hurts Without You" (1976), "Red Light Spells Danger" (1977), "Nights (Feel Like Gettin' Down)" (1981), "Caribbean Queen" (1983), "Love Zone" (1984)
Odyssey
"Native New Yorker" (1977), "Single Again/What Time Does the Balloon Go Up" (1978), Lucky Star (1978), "Use It Up, Wear It Out" (1980), "Going Back to My Roots" (1981)
The Ohio Players
"Skin Tight" (1974), "Fire" (1974), "Love Rollercoaster" (1976)
The O'Jays
"Back Stabbers" (1972), "992 Arguments" (1973), "Love Train" (1973), "Livin' For The Weekend" (1975), "I Love Music" (1976), "Message In Our Music" (1976), "Work On Me" (1977), "Darlin Darlin Baby" (1978), "Usta Be My Girl" (1978), "Strokey Stroke" (1978), "Get On Out and Party" (1979)
The Olympic Runners
"Keep It Up" (1977), "The Kool Gent" (1978), "Sir Dancealot" (1979)
One Way
"Music" (1979), "Cutie Pie" (1981), "Mr. Groove" (1984), "Don't Think About It" (1987), "You Better Quit" (1987) 
Yoko Ono 
"Walking On Thin Ice" (1981)
Yukiko Okada
"Walking in the Moonlight" (1985), "Lady Joker" (1985), "Anara Wo Wasureru Ga Areba" (1985), "Summer Beach" (1985), "Hoshi to Yoru to Koibitobachi" (1985)
The Originals
"Down to Love Town" (1976)
Bobby Orlando
"She Has A Way" (1982), "I'm So Hot For You" (1982), "Reputation" (1983), "Suspicious Minds" (1984), "Givin' Up" (1984)
Tony Orlando
"Don't Let Go" (1978), "They're Playing Our Song" (1979)
Osmonds
"I, I, I" (1978)
Ottawan
"D.I.S.C.O." (1979), "Hands Up Give Me Your Heart" (1981)

P
Gene Page
"Wild Cherry" (1976), "Close Encounters" (1978)
Jeree Palmer 
"Late Night Surrender" (1979)
Paradise Birds
"I Am A Song" (1978)
Dennis Parker (Wade Nichols) 
"Like An Eagle" (1979), "New York By Night" (1979)
Parliament
"Up for the Downstroke" (1974), "Give Up The Funk" (1976), "Flashlight" (1977)
Passion
"Don't Bring Back Memories" (1980), "In New York" (1980)
Billy Paul
"Your Song" (1972), "Let' Em In" (1976), "We All Got A Mission" (1976), "How Good Is Your Game" (1976), "Only The Strong Survive" (1977),"False Faces" (1979), "Bring the Family Back" (1979)
Paul McCartney & Wings
"Silly Love Songs" (1976), "Goodnight Tonight" (1979), "Comin' Up"(1980)
Freda Payne
"Love Magnet" (1977), "Livin' For The Beat" (1978), "Happy Days Are Here Again/Happy Music" (1978), "Red Hot" (1979), I'll Do Anything for You" (1979)
Peaches & Herb
"Shake Your Groove Thing" (1978), "Roller-Skatin' Mate" (1978), "Howzabout Some Love" (1979), "Gettin' Down, Gettin' Down" (1979), "(I Want Us) Back Together" (1979), "Fun Time" (1980), "Dream Come True" (1981)
David Peaston
"Two Wrongs" (1989)
Lana Pellay
"Pistol In My Pocket" (1985)
Teddy Pendergrass
"I Don't Love You Anymore" (1977), "The More I Get, The More I Want" (1977), "Get Up, Get Down, Get Funky, Get Loose" (1978)
Barbara Pennington
"24 Hours a Day" (1977), "You Are the Music within Me" (1978)
The People's Choice
"Do It Any Way You Wanna" (1975), "Movin' in All Directions" (1976)
Houston Person (Jazz, disco)
"Disco Sax" (1975), "Dancing Feet" (1976)
Elvis Presley
"Moody Blue" (1976)
The Persuaders
"Two Women" (1976)
Peter Jacques Band
"Fire Night Dance" (1979), "Walking on Music" (1979), "Fly With The Wind" (1979), "Devil's Run" (1979), "Exotically" (1980), "Counting On Love" (1980), "Drives Me Crazy" (1985)
Esther Phillips
"What a Diff'rence a Day Makes" (1976), "Our Day Will Come" (1978)
Wilson Pickett
"Love Will Keep Us Together" (1976), "Love Dagger" (1977), "Time To Let The Sun Shine On Me" (1977), "Who Turned You On" (1978), "Dance You Down" (1978), "Groovin'" (1978), "I Want You" (1979), "Love Of My Life" (1979)
Pink Lady
"Kiss In The Dark" (1979), "Monday Mona Lisa Club" (1979)
The Players Association
"Love Hangover" (1977), "Disco Inferno" (1977), "Going to the Disco" (1978), "Turn the Music Up!" (1979)
Bonnie Pointer
"I Can't Help Myself (Sugar Pie Honey Bunch)" (1978), "Free Me From My Freedom" (1979), "Heaven Must Have Sent You" (1979)
Noel Pointer
"For You (A Disco Concerto)" (1979)
Pointer Sisters
 "Yes We Can Can" (1973), "How Long" (1973), "Happiness" (1978), "Slow Hand" (1978), "He's So Shy" (1980), "We've Got The Power" (1980), "I'm So Excited" (1982), "Dance Electric" (1982), "Jump (For My Love)" (1983), "Automatic" (1984)
Michel Polnareff
"Lipstick" (1978)
Billy Preston
"Go for It" (duet with Syreeta) (1978), "Disco Dancin'" (1978), "Give It Up, Hot" (1979), "Just for You" (1981)
Prince
"Just As Long As we're Together" (1978), "I Wanna Be Your Lover" (1979), "Sexy Dancer" (1979), "Uptown" (1980), "Controversy" (1981), "1999" (1982)
Arthur Prysock
"When Love Is New" (1976)
Pussyfoot
"The Way That You Do It" (1976), "Ooh Ja Ja" (1977), "Got To Move On" (1978), "It's Alright" (1978)
Asha Puthli (India, USA)
"Latin Lover" (1978), "Peek-A-Boo Boogie" (1978), "I'm Gonna Dance" (1979), "Music Machine (Dedication to Studio 54)" (1979)

Q
Stacey Q
"Two Of Hearts" (1986)
Queen
"Another One Bites The Dust" (1980), "Staying Power" (1982), "Body Language" (1982), "Calling All Girls" (1982)
The Quick
"Sharks Are Cool, Jets Are Hot" (1979), "Hip, Shake, Jerk" (1980), "Young Men Drive Fast" (1980), "Zulu" (1981), "Rhythm of the Jungle" (1982)

R
The Raes
"Que Sera Sera" (1977), "A Little Lovin' (Keeps the Doctor Away)" (1978), "School" (1978), "(I Only Wanna) Get Up and Dance" (1979)
Rahni Harris & F.L.O.
"Six Million Steps (West Runs South)" (1978)
Lou Rawls
"You'll Never Find Another Love Like Mine" (1976), "See You When I Git There" (1977), "Let Me Be Good to You" (1979)
Ray, Goodman & Brown
"Thrill/Friends" (1979)
Raydio
"Jack and Jill" (1978), "Get Down" (1978), "More Than One Way To Love A Woman" (1979), "It's Time To Party Now" (1980), "It's Your Night" (1981),
The Real Thing
"You to Me Are Everything" (1976)
Sharon Redd
"Love Insurance" (1979), "Can You Handle It" (1980), "In the Name of Love" (1982), "Beat the Street" (1982), "Never Give You Up" (1982), "You're the One" (1982), "Send Your Love" (1982), "Love How You Feel" (1983), "Somebody Saves the Night" (1983), "You're a Winner" (1983)
Helen Reddy
"Make Love to Me" (1979)
Martha Reeves
"Love Don't Come No Stronger" (1978), "Skating in the Streets (Dancing in the Streets)" (1979)
Reflections
"Gift-Wrap My Love" (1976)
Clarence Reid
"You Get Me Up" (1979)
Regina Richards
"Baby Love" (1986)
Rhythm Heritage
"Theme from S.W.A.T." (1976), "Baretta's Theme (Keep Your Eye on the Sparrow)" (1977), "Sail away with Me" (1977), "Disco Queen" (1978), "Lifeline" (1979), "Disco House" (1979), "Do You Make Love Like You Dance?" (1979)
Rick Dees & His Cast of Idiots
"Disco Duck" (1976), "Dr. Disco" (1977), "Dis-gorilla" (1977), "You Got Those Lips" (1978)
Minnie Riperton
"Stick Together" (1977), "Here We Go" (1979), "Dancin' and Actin' Crazy" (1979)
Ripple
"The Beat Goes On" (1977)
The Ritchie Family
"I Want to Dance with You (Dance with Me)" (1975), "Brazil" (1975), "The Best Disco In Town" (1976), "Arabian Nights (Medley)" (1976), "Life Is Music" (1977), "African Queens" (1977), "American Generation" (1978), "Put Your Feet to the Beat" (1979)
Johnny Rivers
"Slow Dancin' (Swayin' To The Music)" (1977), "Curious Mind (Um, Um, Um, Um, Um, Um)" (1978)
Vicki Sue Robinson
"Turn the Beat Around" (1976), "Never Gonna Let You Go" (1976), "Let the Sun Shine In" (1977), "Hold Tight" (1977), "Daylight" (1978), "Feels So Good It Must Be Wrong" (1979), "To Sir With Love" (1983)
Kenny Rogers
"You Turn The Light On" (1979)
The Rolling Stones
"Miss You" (1978), "Emotional Rescue" (1980)
Sonny Rollins
"Disco Monk" (1979)
Linda Ronstadt
"Just One Look" (1978)
Rose Royce
"Car Wash" (1976), "It Makes You Feel Like Dancin'" (1977), "Do Your Dance" (1977), "Is It Love You're After" (1979), "Lock It Down" (1979)
Diana Ross
"Love Hangover" (1976), "The Boss" (1979), "Upside Down" (1980), "My Old Piano" (1980), "I'm Coming Out" (1980)
Rouge(Female group)
"Don't Stop Singing" (1978)
Round One
"In Zaire" (1985), "On Top" (1985)
Roundtree(Richard Roundtree)
"Get on Up" (1979), "Discocide" (1979)
Roxy Music
"Love Is The Drug" (1975), "Angel Eyes" (1979)
David Ruffin
"Fallin' in Love with You" (1977), "Sexy Dancer" (1979), "Let Your Love Rain Down On Me", (1979)
Merrilee Rush
"Save Me" (1977), "You" (1977)
Patrice Rushen
"Haven't You Heard" (1979), "Look Up" (1980), "Never Gonna Give You Up" (1980), "Don't Blame Me" (1980), "Forget Me Nots" (1982)

References